Elizabeth H. Simmons is an American theoretical physicist, and executive vice chancellor at University of California, San Diego. Formerly, she was a distinguished professor of physics at Michigan State University, the dean of Lyman Briggs College, and the associate provost for faculty and academic staff development. She has also held positions at Harvard University and Boston University. Simmons is married to fellow physicist, R. Sekhar Chivukula. Together they have two children.

Education 
A graduate of Harvard University, Simmons earned her master's degree in physics from the University of Cambridge. It was at the University of Cambridge where she wrote her thesis on the origins and symmetry of some incommensurate phases, under the direction of Volker Heine, PhD. Simmons would return to Harvard University for her PhD in physics, in which Simmons wrote her thesis on electroweak and flavor symmetry breaking, under the direction of Howard Georgi, PhD.

Occupations 
The first position Simmons held in academia was at Harvard University (1990–1993), where she was a postdoctoral fellow in the Department of Physics specializing in theoretical particle physics.

In 1993, Simmons was hired by Boston University as an assistant professor of physics. However, in 1998 Simmons was promoted to the title of associate professor of physics—where she would remain until 2003. During her time at Boston University, Simmons was appointed the associate chair for undergraduate studies (2001–2003) in the Department of Physics. In 2002, Simmons was named the director of Boston University's Learning Resource Network for Pre-College Outreach.

After her time at Boston University, Simmons moved to Michigan State University, where she was hired as a professor in physics in 2003. In addition to her position as professor of physics, Simmons was named the director of Lyman Briggs School of Science. In 2007, the school returned to the college level, and Simmons was named dean of Lyman Briggs College. Then in 2013, Simmons was promoted to the title of university distinguished professor of physics. During the next year, Simmons was named the acting dean of the College of Arts and Letters (2014–15). More recently, 2016, Simmons was appointed the position of associate provost for faculty and academic staff development. Simmons held three positions at Michigan State University: dean of Lyman Briggs College, university distinguished professor of physics, and associate provost for faculty and academic staff development.

Work on outreach and inclusion in science

Women in STEM 
"Elizabeth Simmons is a strong advocate for the advancement of women scholars in mathematics and science ...", a quote from Dr. Lou Anna K. Simon, president of Michigan State University. One way that Simmons advocates for this advancement is through public speaking. Simmons argues that there are several contributing factors adding to the issue of gender inequity in STEM field—such as implicit bias, gender schema, and stereotype threat. Simmons proposes several solutions to some of these factors, which include increasing aware of implicit bias, promoting diversity for the betterment of STEM, and promoting gender-neutral parental leave.

QUEST 
In addition to public speaking, Simmons and her husband founded Quantum Education for Students and Teachers, better known as QUEST. QUEST is an outreach program, through Michigan State University, with the purpose of "sharing the fun and excitement of quantum physics with educators, students, and the general public".
 List of Local Outreach Activities
 East Lansing Girls’ Math Science Conference
 MSU Grandparents University
 MSU Lyman Briggs College’s Spartan Science Day
 MSU Physics and Astronomy Research Opportunities for Undergraduates
 MSU Physics and Astronomy Society of Physics Students
 MSU Visiting International Professionals Programs
 List of National Organizations Sponsoring Outreach Activities
 APS Division of Particles and Fields
 Aspen Center for Physics
 LHC Theory Initiative
 QuarkNet
 Summer Science Program, Inc.

LGBT physicists  
Also, Elizabeth Simmons is a current member of the Ad-Hoc Committee on LGBT Issues for the American Physical Society. The purpose of this committee is to look into issues relevant to LGBT, and other sexual- and gender-minority physicists. The committee is responsible for investigating their (LGBT persons) “representation in physics, assess the educational and professional climate in physics, recommend changes in policies and practices that impact LGBT physicists, and address other issues that affect inclusion.” In March 2016, the Ad-Hoc Committee on LGBT Issues released their full report. The report covered several issues faced by the LGBT community, and touched on several possible recommendations.

Research  
Simmons is a theoretical particle physicist, and her research focuses on the origins of the masses of the elementary subatomic particles. Even further, Simmons is interested in the question of "why we have mass at all?" Over the years, Simmons has contributed to over a hundred papers—including published papers, conference papers, review papers, and more.

To see list of research articles, please visit Dr. Simmons’ LBC Profile and her Full Curriculum Vitae.

Honors and awards 
During Simmons’ time at Boston University, she was honored with the American Association of University Women (Curie) Fellowship. The fellowships granted by the AAUW support female scholars who are completing dissertations, planning research, and preparing research for publication. In 2002, Simmons was awarded the United Methodist Church Scholar/Teacher of the Year. This award acknowledges outstanding scholars for their dedication to learning and to the institution. Later, in 2005, Simmons presented with the ACE Michigan Distinguished Women in Higher Education Leadership Award—which is the highest honor given by the Michigan-ACE Network.,  More recently, in February 2012, the American Physical Society named Simmons the Women Physicist of the Month. The following year (2013) Simmons was awarded the Robert F. Banks Award for Institutional Leadership—an award reserved for any faculty member in recognition of extraordinary and sustained leadership that advances Michigan State University’s commitment to connectivity, quality, and inclusion., 

To see list of honors/awards, please visit Dr. Simmons’ LBC Profile and her Full Curriculum Vitae.

References 

Year of birth missing (living people)
Living people
University of California, San Diego faculty
21st-century American physicists
Theoretical physicists
Harvard University alumni
Alumni of the University of Cambridge
University of Chicago alumni
Fellows of the American Physical Society